David Charles Bierk  (June 9, 1944 – August 28, 2002) was an American-Canadian realist painter known for working in the postmodern genre.

Early life 
Born in Appleton, Wisconsin, to Glennon Bierk and Doris Ruth Steenson, Bierk moved with his mother to Lafayette, California, following his parents' divorce. Bierk said of his childhood, "We were plunked into an upper middle class neighbourhood before divorce was common, and she [my mother] not only provided for me but also was my mother, father, teacher and friend. It was my uncle Spiros, though, who taught me – at an early age – what you might call the work ethic. I always worked, at least from the time I was in grade six or seven. Spiros owned a mayonnaise factory in San Francisco and I started working there, doing things like scraping the labels of returned mayonnaise bottles and scraping the mold from cheese – eight hour days in the summers from the time I was 12 or 13."

Bierk graduated from high school in 1962 and joined the National Guard. Initially he studied at California College of Arts & Crafts, Bierk dropped out after a year and half, and as he described it, "...I took off, hitchhiked across the country, ended up in Florida, and then caught a boat to the Bahamas....I got a job as librarian at...Mary Star of the Sea School, a Catholic grammar school, where I persuaded Sister Mary Alice to let me teach art as well."

Upon his return to California, Bierk was admitted to Humboldt State University where he earned a Bachelor of Arts 1969, and a master of fine arts in 1970. Bierk's sister-in-law lived in Toronto, and in 1971 he immigrated there with his young family.

Career 
During the year that he lived in Toronto, Bierk immersed himself in the local cultural scene, which he described as exploratory. Then he moved to Peterborough, Ontario in 1972 to take up a teaching position at Kenner Collegiate Vocational Institute, and later at Fleming College. Along with poet Dennis Tourbin, Bierk founded and directed Artspace between 1974 and 1987, which was one of Canada's earliest artist operated art centers.

Bierk's early painting drew on sources such as diverse as American West Coast Pop and Photo Realism. In Canada, he expanded his West Coast Pop into Canadian images as well as painting a Canadian Rock series, and a multiple fold painting series. In the early 1980s, he began his Repaintings, quoting from famous artists of the past. In a June 2001 Art in America review, critic Jonathan Goodman wrote that
"Bierk quotes from the past not so much to critique current art as to reinterpret a way of seeing that he associates with artists as disparate as Vermeer, Eakins, Ingres, Manet and Fantin-Latour....[Bierk] accomplishes this particularly well when he starkly juxtaposes two or three of his eclectic art-historical references within a single work."

Noting the work's "virtuoso" technical quality, Goodman also observes that Bierk's "marvelously romantic" landscape paintings are, unlike these referential paintings, invented images, rather than appropriated or copied from masterworks. Both Goodman's review and Bierk's 2002 New York Times obituary note that Bierk used framing to call attention, in a way that is pointedly "postmodern", to the historical disjunction between the evoked masterworks and the contemporary cultural environment: "He painted copies of works by artists like Vermeer or the Hudson River School painter Frederic Edwin Church, for example, and framed them within broad steel panels, setting up a tension between humanism and old masterly craft on the one hand, and Modernist abstraction and industrial fabrication on the other."

Exhibitions 
His solo shows included exhibitions at Artspace, Peterborough (1976), the Art Gallery of Peterborough (1981–1983), and Museum London (1983). The travelling exhibition After History: The Paintings of David Bierck organized by the Montgomery Museum of Fine Arts, Montgomery, Alabama in 2002 toured in Canada. His group exhibitions were extensive. In 2017, his work was included in the Robert McLaughlin Gallery's show titled Land, Sea and Air.

Public collections 
 Art Gallery of Greater Victoria, Victoria, British Columbia
 Art Gallery of Ontario, Toronto
 Art Gallery of Peterborough, Peterborough, Ontario
 Art Gallery of Windsor, Windsor, Ontario
 Boca Raton Museum of Art, Boca Raton, Florida
 City of Peterborough, Ontario
 The Dayton Art Institute, Dayton, Ohio
 Evansville Museum of Arts and Science, Evansville, Indiana
 Montgomery Museum of Fine Arts, Montgomery, Alabama
 Museum London, London, Ontario
 National Gallery of Canada, Ottawa, Ontario
 The Robert McLaughlin Gallery, Oshawa, Ontario
 Tom Thomson Art Gallery Owen Sound, Ontario

Awards 
 1991 Best Album Cover of the Year, RAW Magazine
 member in 1998 of the Royal Canadian Academy of Arts
 posthumously awarded the Queen's Golden Jubilee Medal

Notable works 

 Hockey Night in Canada (1975)
 The Laundromat, A Canadian Interior (1975)
 The Cremation of Sam McGee (Canada Post stamp, 1976)
 Locally one of his most famous paintings is his iconic, larger than life portrait of Queen Elizabeth II that overlooked the Peterborough Memorial Centre arena. Completed in 1981 and measuring 3.6m x 2.4m (12' x 8') is believed to be the largest portrait of the Queen in North America.
 Internationally his most widely recognizable work is the 1991 album cover of Skid Row's Slave to the Grind.

Personal life and death 
Bierk became a Canadian citizen in 1978. He married Kathleen Mae Hunter in Freeport, Bahamas, in 1967. Following his divorce from Hunter, Bierk married Elizabeth Lovett Aimers at Abercorn, Quebec, in 1980. Bierk had eight children: Sebastian Bach, the former lead singer for the rock group Skid Row; Zac Bierk, a former ice hockey player; Heather Dylan, an actress; Lisa Hare; Alexander Bierk; Jeffrey Bierk; Nicholas Bierk; and Charles Bierk. 

Bierk died in Peterborough, Ontario, in August 2002, aged 58, from pneumonia related to ongoing leukemia.

References

External links 
 Art Gallery of Victoria, British Columbia: link to twelve paintings by Bierk in this public collection, illustrated with color images.

1944 births
2002 deaths
Deaths from pneumonia in Ontario
American expatriates in Canada
20th-century Canadian painters
Canadian male painters
People from Appleton, Minnesota
Deaths from cancer in Ontario
20th-century American painters
American male painters
Canadian people of Norwegian descent
Postmodern artists
Members of the Royal Canadian Academy of Arts
Deaths from leukemia
California National Guard personnel
20th-century American male artists
20th-century Canadian male artists